Cynthia Sikes Yorkin (born January 2, 1954) is an American actress known for her work on St. Elsewhere and Blade Runner 2049.

Life and career
Cynthia Sikes was born Cynthia Lee Sikes in Coffeyville, Kansas, in 1954. Early in her career she went by Cindy Lee Sikes, and later used Cynthia Sikes professionally until her marriage to Bud Yorkin, where she changed it to Cynthia Sikes Yorkin.

In 1972, Yorkin won the crowning title of Miss Kansas and started attending Wichita State University. She then entered the Miss America pageant where she won the preliminary swimsuit competition and became one of the Top 10 finalists overall. While still at Wichita, she was offered an invitation to travel with Bob Hope's 1972 USO Christmas Special as a singer/dancer, traveling from Vietnam to Thailand to Diego Garcia, in an effort to entertain homesick soldiers.

The tour with Hope and the Miss America competition drastically altered Yorkin’s life and career path. She returned to college, this time attending Southern Methodist University in Dallas, and studied Journalism, before moving to California to begin her career as an actress.

In 1977, Yorkin took the stage at William Ball's American Conservatory Theater in San Francisco. She earned a scholarship and performed in many productions, including Shakespeare's A Winter's Tale, Dürrenmatt's The Visit, The Glass Menagerie, A Hatful of Rain, Bedtime Story, and A Christmas Carol.  She eventually made her Broadway debut as the "Baker’s Wife," a lead role in Stephen Sondheim's musical Into the Woods.

After her Broadway stint, Yorkin began getting offers for roles in popular television programs and films. For three years she played Dr. Annie Cavanero on NBC’s St. Elsewhere opposite Denzel Washington, and appeared in episodes of Magnum P.I. Her next recurring role was on L.A. Law as Judge Monica Ryan, then Yorkin produced and starred in the CBS film Sins of Silence alongside Lindsay Wagner. Her other credits include playing Dr. Sidney Walden on the popular series JAG, then in Arliss. Yorkin's most recent TV role was a four-episode arc on NBC's Aquarius with David Duchovny.

Her feature film credits include co-starring roles in the comedies Arthur 2: On the Rocks with Dudley Moore, That's Life! with Jack Lemmon, Love Hurts with Jeff Daniels, Possums with Mac Davis, and in director Henry Jaglom's Going Shopping.

In 1999, Yorkin expanded her interests to public works and became more involved in government after she was personally chosen by President Bill Clinton to serve on the Advisory Committee for the Kennedy Center for the Performing Arts. In 2005, she was appointed California State Commissioner for the California Service Corps by former Governor Arnold Schwarzenegger, and also founded an emergency preparedness curriculum for K-12 schools, known as Team Safe-T. Six years later, Yorkin was brought on to the UCLA School of Public Health Dean’s Advisory Board to help raise funds to build the global bio lab on campus. She worked closely with Cindy Horn and Dr. Linda Rosenstock, the Dean of UCLA's School of Public Health.

In 2015, Yorkin segued into producing her first feature film, the critically acclaimed Blade Runner 2049, a project directed by Oscar nominee Denis Villeneuve and starring Academy Award nominees Ryan Gosling and Harrison Ford. The film garnered a total of five Academy Awards nominations, winning for Best Visual Effects and finally earning Roger Deakins a win for Best Cinematographer. She brought this project to Alcon Entertainment with her late husband and producing partner, Bud Yorkin, after acquiring the final rights from his former partner Jerry Perenchio in 2010. Cynthia helmed Blade Runner 2049 from beginning to end, ensuring its success to pay tribute to her late husband.

Personal life 
Cynthia Yorkin was married to prolific producer and director, Bud Yorkin, for 26 years. The two met in 1985. They were married on June 24, 1989, and had two children: Jessica and Michael.  Bud directed Cynthia in Arthur 2: On the Rocks, and again in the 1990 film Love Hurts. In 2005, Cynthia and Bud decided to revive the Blade Runner franchise as producing partners. In 2010, they partnered with Alcon Entertainment to produce the film. Over the years Bud’s health deteriorated, concluding with his death on August 18, 2015. Cynthia went on to produce the film and honor his legacy. 

Blade Runner 2049 received rave reviews and went on to earn five Academy Award nominations, winning for Best Cinematography and for Best Visual Effects.

Filmography

Film

Television

References

External links

1954 births
Living people
People from Coffeyville, Kansas
Miss America 1970s delegates
Actresses from Kansas
American television actresses
American film actresses
20th-century American people
21st-century American women